Ophyx talesea is a moth of the family Erebidae. It is found in New Britain.

References

Ophyx
Moths described in 1984
Moths of Papua New Guinea